The Never Ending Illusion is the second studio album from Italian Progressive metal band Daedalus.

Roland Grapow (Helloween, Masterplan) mixed the recordings and Mark Wilkinson (Marillion, Iron Maiden, Judas Priest) drew the artwork. 

Some vocal sections in "Mare di Stelle" (the only track sung in Italian in this album) were recorded by Roberto Tiranti (Labyrinth) and Alessandro Corvaglia. 

In this album some acoustic instruments were used, including double bass and French horn.

Track listing

Credits
Davide Merletto - vocals
Andrea Torretta - guitar
Fabio Gremo - bass
Giuseppe Spanò - synth
Davide La Rosa - drums

External links
 - Official website
 - Official Myspace page
 - Official Facebook page
 - Galileo Records

Daedalus (band) albums
2009 albums